Ebenezer "Slick" Smith (August 17, 1929 - January 27, 1997) was an American stock car racing driver. A native of Atlanta, Georgia, he was competitor in the NASCAR Grand National Series (now NASCAR Cup Series) and competed in the first-ever series race in 1949.

He was one of the first drivers to receive sponsorship from a car manufacturer, running the 1950 race at North Wilkesboro Speedway in a Nash Ambassador previously driven by Bill France Sr. and Curtis Turner in the 1947 Carrera Panamericana.

References

External links

1997 deaths
1929 births
Racing drivers from Atlanta
NASCAR drivers